Cyperus ochraceus is a species of sedge that is native to Central America, southern parts of North America and South America.

The species was first formally described by the botanist Martin Vahl in 1805.

See also 
 List of Cyperus species

References 

ochraceus
Taxa named by Martin Vahl
Plants described in 1805
Flora of Mexico
Flora of Alabama
Flora of Argentina
Flora of the Bahamas
Flora of Belize
Flora of Bolivia
Flora of Brazil
Flora of Colombia
Flora of Costa Rica
Flora of Cuba
Flora of Florida
Flora of Ecuador
Flora of Haiti
Flora of Georgia (U.S. state)
Flora of Guatemala
Flora of Jamaica
Flora of Louisiana
Flora of Mississippi
Flora of Nicaragua
Flora of Panama
Flora of Paraguay
Flora of Peru
Flora of Puerto Rico
Flora of Texas
Flora of Venezuela
Flora without expected TNC conservation status